West Island is an island in Fairhaven, Massachusetts, United States, on Buzzards Bay.  Approximately two-thirds of the island is forest.  Water and sewage restrictions have limited its growth. Fairhaven is located in southeastern Bristol County, near the city of New Bedford.

External links

Fairhaven, Massachusetts
Coastal islands of Massachusetts
Islands of Bristol County, Massachusetts